The Lenru is a co-operative apartment building in the Norwood neighborhood of the Bronx, New York City. 
The Lenru, (named after its original owner and his sister, Lenny and Ruth Kandell), was built in 1928 in the Jacobethan Revival style, which combined Tudor Revival and Gothic Revival or Elizabethan accents and was earmarked for restoration by the Mosholu Preservation Corporation in the late 1980s, becoming the corporation's first rehabilitation project. It sold to the Lenru Apartment Corporation to complete its conversion into a co-op in 1991.

The structure stands across from the Williamsbridge Oval Park, the former site of the old Williamsbridge Reservoir.  It contains 104 units and has 6 stories.

Image gallery

References

Jacobethan architecture
Apartment buildings in New York City
Condominiums and housing cooperatives in the Bronx
Norwood, Bronx